Kalateh-ye Bayat (also Romanized as Kalāteh-ye Bayāt) is a village in Beyhaq Rural District, Sheshtomad District, Sabzevar County, Razavi Khorasan Province, Iran. At the 2006 census, its population was 52, in 20 families.

References 

Populated places in Sabzevar County